In enzymology, a galacturonokinase is an enzyme that catalyzes the chemical reaction

ATP + D-galacturonate  ADP + 1-phospho-alpha-D-galacturonate

Thus, the two substrates of this enzyme are ATP and D-galacturonate, whereas its two products are ADP and 1-phospho-alpha-D-galacturonate.

This enzyme belongs to the family of transferases, specifically those transferring phosphorus-containing groups (phosphotransferases) with an alcohol group as acceptor.  The systematic name of this enzyme class is ATP:D-galacturonate 1-phosphotransferase. This enzyme is also called galacturonokinase (phosphorylating) D-galacturonic acid kinase.  This enzyme participates in nucleotide sugars metabolism.

References 

 

EC 2.7.1
Enzymes of unknown structure